The Bond of Association was a document created in 1584 by Francis Walsingham and William Cecil after the failure of the Throckmorton Plot in 1583.

Contents

The document obliged all signatories to execute any person that:
attempted to usurp the throne
successfully usurped the throne
made an attempt on Elizabeth's life
successfully assassinated Elizabeth

In the last case, the document also made it obligatory for the signatories to hunt down the killer.

Royal approval

Elizabeth authorised the Bond to achieve statutory authority.

Implications

The Bond of Association was a key legal precedent for the execution of Mary, Queen of Scots, in 1587. Walsingham discovered alleged evidence that Mary, in a letter to Anthony Babington, had given her approval to a plot to assassinate Elizabeth and by Right of Succession take the English throne. Ironically, Mary herself was a signatory of the Bond.

References

British monarchy
1584 in law